Rockland Senior High School is public high school located at 52 MacKinlay Way in Rockland, Massachusetts, United States. The current high school building opened in 1957. Between 2010 and 2012 it underwent an $86 million renovation project.

History
Rockland's first high school was located in the Lincoln School, built in 1892 at the corner of Howard and Church Streets. This building became a grammar school with the opening of the new Rockland High School in 1909.

In 1928, a new, larger senior-junior high school was built at 100 Taunton Avenue. It was designed by J. Williams Beal, Sons, who also designed the Rockland Post Office and the Dyer Memorial Library in Abington. The current high school, also designed by J. Williams Beal, Sons, opened in 1957. The first graduating class was in 1959. In June 2021, Rockland Senior High School was placed into a state program for schools or districts that disproportionately suspend nonwhite students or students with disabilities.

Athletics

Basketball

 State Champions - 1972, 2004
 29x League Champions- 1963, 1970, 1971, 1972, 1974, 1975, 1979, 1981, 1982, 1984, 1985, 1990, 1991, 1997, 1998, 1999, 2000, 2001, 2002, 2003, 2004, 2006, 2007, 2008, 2010, 2013, 2016, 2017, 2018

Rockland won the 2004 state title under coach Bob Fisher. The Bulldogs finished with a 24–2 record that season with one of their losses coming to Cardinal Spellman whom they later beat in the South Sectional Semi-Finals. In the south finals, Rockland squared off against rival Norwell and knocked the Clippers off in dramatic fashion to move on to the state semi-finals at the then Fleet Center. The Bulldogs went on to knock off Lynn Tech and then New Leadership, 63–60, to clinch their second state championship in the school's history, backed by Coppens' 31 points. Rockland also had a remarkable run of 11 straight seasons in which the Bulldogs reached at least the South Sectional Finals. The home of the Bulldogs, simply known as "the Dog Pound" is currently under reconstruction along with the new renovations of the High School and the Bulldogs expectations are higher than ever. The bulldogs have also in the 201011 year have left the Patriot league Fisher division which they have been successful in and have won league titles four of the last six years. They are now in the south shore league and are title contenders every year as they are finally with schools near their size and division, but the South Shore league is also very competitive and will be tough to play in. The 2011-2012 campaign, Coach Fred Damon's Bulldogs finished with a record of 19–3. In the second round of the MIAA tournament, the fourth-seeded Bulldogs closed the Dog Pound with a crushing two-point loss to fifth-seeded Cardinal Spellman. In the 2012-2013 year, the bulldogs won the south shore league title and made it to the south sectional championship but their season was ended by the powerful Wareham Vikings. The 2013-2014 bulldogs finished second in the south shore league by one game to Cohasset they made it to the second round of the MIAA state tournament before falling to Westport. The Bulldogs won their third consecutive South Shore League title in 2018, compiling a league record of 38-1 over that timeframe. The Bulldogs have qualified for the State Tournament 45 of the last 48 years.

Football

 State Champions - 1992, 1998, 2000, 2021

Hockey

The Rockland hockey team made a run to the South Sectional Finals in 2011-12, posting a regular season record of 14–5–1 while knocking off Blue Hills Regional and Somerset-Berkley in the first two round respectively. In the South semifinals, Rockland matched up against the No. 2 team in the state and No. 1 in the south: Medfield. The Warriors had the best goalie in the state by far, stopping 180 shots out of 202 taken up to that point. Serious underdogs, Rockland upset Medfield, 6–2, en route to the finals, where the scrappy Bulldogs fell to Medway High, 4–1.

References

Public high schools in Massachusetts
Schools in Plymouth County, Massachusetts